Eupithecia blenna is a moth in the family Geometridae. It is endemic to central China (Sichuan and Shaanxi).

The forewings are dark brownish grey and the hindwings are dirty white along the costa and in the middle and brownish grey along the terminal and anal margins.

References

External links

Moths described in 2006
Endemic fauna of China
Moths of Asia
blenna